London Wildlife Trust (LWT), founded in 1981, is a local nature conservation charity for Greater London. It is one of 46 members of the Royal Society of Wildlife Trusts (known as The Wildlife Trusts), each of which is a local nature conservation charity for its area. The Trust aims to protect London's wildlife and wild spaces, and it manages over 40 nature reserves in Greater London. One of its campaigns is to turn London's gardens into mini-nature reserves, and it provides education services for schools. Local groups work on reserves and organise walks.

The Trust's oldest reserves include Sydenham Hill Wood, which was managed by Southwark Wildlife Group before 1982 and thus was already a Trust reserve at that date. The campaign to save Gunnersbury Triangle began that same year, succeeding in 1983 when a public inquiry ruled that the site could not be developed because of its value for nature. The small Centre for Wildlife Gardening in East Dulwich has won an award for its work. The Trust pioneered the systematic recording of data on wildlife and the environment in the capital. Its "Biological Recording Project" became the semi-independent "Greenspace Information for Greater London", known as GIGL.

The Trust has some 50 members of staff and 500 volunteers who work together on activities as varied as water management, chalk grassland restoration, helping people with special needs and giving children an opportunity to go pond-dipping. The Trust collaborates with government agencies, local authorities, housing associations, commercial companies, building developers and sponsors to create plans and strategies at local, regional and national level, including the All London Green Grid and Biodiversity Action Plans. The Trust's reserves receive over 230,000 visitors per year. The trust is supported by over 14,000 members.

In its strategy document, For a Wilder City. London Wildlife Trust 2015–20, the Trust sets out its vision and mission, as well as plans for a five-year period. The trust states its vision as: "A London alive with nature, where everyone can experience and enjoy wildlife." It describes its mission in three parts as "Protecting, Restoring and Creating wild places for nature", "Engaging, Inspiring and Enabling people to connect with nature", and "Championing, Challenging, and Influencing people to stand up for nature". Among its aims for protecting and restoring, the Trust intends to bring 30 of its reserves to "Favourable Condition" by 2020. It plans to restore the Sydenham and Norwood woodlands, and the "Living Landscape" of the Great North Wood as a part of The Great North Wood Project, and to reintroduce the water vole to the River Wandle.

The Trust's aims for engaging and enabling include new visitor centres for the reserves at Camley Street, Gunnersbury Triangle, Woodberry Wetlands and Walthamstow Wetlands. and training young people in its "Wild Talent" programme. Its aims for championing nature include creating a London development biodiversity standard, hosting the London Environment Educators' Forum, collaborating on projects across the city, and opening new reserves such as Byng Road (High Barnet), Braeburn Park (Crayford) and Crane Meadows (Heathrow). Recent projects have helped to support pollinators and to conserve the Welsh Harp reservoir. The Trust has three permanent charitable objectives, namely the conservation of places and objects of scientific interest and natural beauty, and of biodiversity, in Greater London; the education of the public, especially young people, in nature conservation, sustainability, and "the appreciation of natural beauty"; and research into nature conservation and the use of natural resources.

Nature reserves

Key

Public access

BPA = access only by prior arrangement with the Trust
FP  = access only to public footpath through the site
No  = no public access
PL  = public access at limited times
Yes = public access to all or most of the site

Classifications

LNR                    = Local Nature Reserve
SAC            = Special Area of Conservation
SINCB1 = Site of Borough Importance for Nature Conservation, Grade 1
SINCB2 = Site of Borough Importance for Nature Conservation, Grade 2
SINCL  = Site of Local Importance for Nature Conservation
SINCM  = Site of Metropolitan Importance for Nature Conservation
SPA                 = Special Protection Area
SSSI                                        = Site of Special Scientific Interest

Sites

Sites formerly managed by the Trust
 Bennett's Hole
 Pyl Brook
 Rowley Green Common
 The Wood, Surbiton
 Bellenden Road Nature Garden
 Fishponds Wood and Beverley Meads
 Greville Place
 Mill Hill Old Railway
 Uxbridge College Pond
 Uxbridge Moor
 Old Ford Island

See also

 List of Local Nature Reserves in Greater London
 List of Sites of Special Scientific Interest in Greater London

Notes

References

Sources

External links

 

 
Charities based in London
Environment of London
1981 establishments in England
Conservation in London